Quiet Electric Drive (QED)—sometimes called by the misnomer Quiet Electronic Drive—is an Office of Naval Research (ONR)-sponsored program to develop technologies for silent maritime propulsion for the United States Navy.

According to the ONR, QED's role is to "address the Navy's operational gaps in surface ship and submarine maneuverability and acoustic signature. Quiet Electric Drives, or QEDs, are quiet, efficient and power dense. The primary objective of QED is demonstrating the utility of the motor as an actuator to obtain signature reduction performance while increasing tactical speed and maneuverability". 

Its existence is known particularly via a 2005 court case in which five ethnic Chinese suspects have been accused of attempting to smuggle data from a U.S. defense contractor. An FBI affidavit stated QED to be "an extremely sensitive project ... considered by the Navy to be significant military equipment and therefore banned for export to countries specifically denied by the U.S. State Department, including the PRC (China)". This classified information has been transferred by Chi Mak a naturalized Chinese citizen of the US to the PRC via espionage.

See also
 Magnetohydrodynamic drive

References
 Bail Denied for Couple Allegedly Involved in Chinese Espionage Plot
 US holds four China spy suspects
 

Equipment of the United States Navy
Marine propulsion